Teresa Riott (born 13 May 1990) is a Spanish actress. She became popular for her role as Nerea in Netflix series Valeria.

Filmography

Television 
Valeria
El inmortal

References

External links 

Spanish film actresses
Spanish television actresses
21st-century Spanish actresses
Actresses from Catalonia
1990 births
Living people